Many Christians believe in a widespread conversion of the Jews to Christianity, which they often consider as an end-time event. Some Christian denominations consider the conversion of the Jews imperative and pressing, and as a result they make it their mission to proselytize among them (See also: Proselytization and counter-proselytization of Jews).

In the New Testament
The biblical basis for this expectation is found in : 
I do not want you to be ignorant of this mystery, brothers, so that you may not be conceited: Israel has experienced a hardening in part until the full number of the Gentiles has come in. And so all Israel will be saved... (NIV). 

The meaning of Romans 11:25-26a has been disputed. Moo himself interprets the passage as predicting a "large-scale conversion of Jewish people at the end of this age" through "faith in the gospel of Jesus their Messiah".

Pope Benedict XVI in his book Jesus of Nazareth: Holy Week (2011) has suggested that the church should not be targeting Jews for conversion efforts, since "Israel is in the hands of God, who will save it ‘as a whole’ at the proper time."

In church history
Since the Middle Ages, the Catholic Church has formally upheld Constitutio pro Judæis (Formal Statement on the Jews), which stated: 

Despite such papal declarations, personal, economic and cultural pressure on the Jews to convert persisted, often stirred by clerics. Persecution and forcible displacements of Jews occurred for many centuries, and were regarded as not inconsistent with the papal bull because there was no "violence to force baptism". There were occasional gestures to reconciliation. Pogroms and forcible conversions were common throughout Christian Europe, including organized violence, restrictive land ownership and professional lives, forcible relocation and ghettoization, mandatory dress codes, and at times humiliating actions and torture. The object often was for the Jews to choose between conversion, migration or dying. The Anglican Ministry Among Jewish People, founded in 1809, used non-coercive means in its outreach and missionary efforts.

Throughout the history of the Christian church, there have been times when people predicted or expected the conversion of the Jews as an imminent event. Most famous among these is Martin Luther's early enthusiasm that the event would occur through Protestant gospel preaching. When this did not occur, Luther changed his attitude and wrote  On the Jews and Their Lies, in which he appears to reject the possibility of Jewish conversion.

Other Protestant Reformers accepted the idea of a conversion of the Jews, including Martin Bucer, Peter Martyr and Theodore Beza. It was a popular idea among the Puritans. Puritan works on the subject included The Calling of the Jews (William Gouge, 1621), Some Discourses upon the Point of the Conversion of the Jews (Moses Wall, 1650) and The Mystery of Israel's Salvation Explained and Applied (Increase Mather, 1669). There was disagreement over when this conversion would take place – a significant minority, beginning with Thomas Brightman (1607) and Elnathan Parr (1620) predicted a Jewish conversion before the end of time, one that would inaugurate an era of worldwide blessing. The view of an era of blessing preceding the return of Christ became known as postmillennialism.

Donald M. Lewis in his "The Origins of Christian Zionism" (CUP, 2009) has argued that it was the German Pietist leader, Phillip Jacob Spener, who understood the conversion of the Jews to be a central task given to the church in his seminal publication, "Pia Desiderata" in 1675, and that Spener tied this into his own apocalyptic speculations.  Christ would not return until the Church had obeyed the command to preach the Christian gospel "to the Jew first" (echoing the words of St. Paul).  Under Spener's successor, August Hermann Francke, the German Pietists from their base at the University of Halle developed sophisticated approaches to Jewish evangelism.  Lewis further argues that it was this Pietist influence that impacted British evangelicals in the early 19th century and was clearly behind the establishment of the London Society for Promoting Christianity Amongst the Jews in 1809 (now the Church Mission to the Jewish People).  In his more recent book, "A Short History of Christian Zionism from the Reformation to the Twenty-First Century," (IVPress, 2021), Lewis has further developed his argument about the pivotal role of the Pietists in influencing evangelicalism in the English-speaking world. See: Donald M. Lewis. "The Origins of Christian Zionism: Lord Shaftesbury and Evangelical Support for a Jewish Homeland" Cambridge University Press. 2009.  and Donald M. Lewis "A Short History of Christian Zionism: From the Reformation to the Twenty-First Century" InterVarsity Press. 2021. 

The conversion of the Jews continued to be the hope of British evangelicals in the 18th and 19th centuries. Iain Murray says of Charles Simeon that "the conversion of the Jews was perhaps the warmest interest in his life", and that he would choose the conversion of 6 million Jews over the conversion of 600 million Gentiles, since the former would lead to the latter. It was also a key concern of the Church of Scotland, which in 1839 sent Robert Murray M'Cheyne and Andrew Bonar to Palestine on a "Mission of Inquiry into the state of the Jews".  

The conversion of the Jews plays a part in some, but not all, premillennial dispensationalist thinking. Hal Lindsey, one of the most popular American promoters of dispensationalism, has written in The Late Great Planet Earth that per Ezekiel (39:6-8), after Jews fight off a "Russian" invasion, Jews will see this as a miracle and convert to Christianity.

On occasions people have predicted a specific date for this event to occur. Henry Archer, for example, in his 1642 work The Personall Reigne of Christ Upon Earth, predicted the conversion of the Jews to occur in the 1650s, 1290 years (a number derived from Daniel 12:11) after Julian the Apostate.

In ecumenism
Attempts by Christians to convert Jews to Christianity is an important issue in Christian-Jewish relations and Christian-Jewish reconciliation. Jewish groups such as the Anti-Defamation League have denounced attempts to convert Jews to Christianity as causing antisemitism. Pope Benedict XVI in 2011 suggested that the church should not be targeting Jews for conversion efforts, since "Israel is in the hands of God, who will save it ‘as a whole’ at the proper time." A number of Progressive Christian denominations have publicly declared that they will no longer proselytize Jews, while other mainline Christian and conservative Christian churches have said they will continue their efforts to evangelize among Jews, saying that this is not antisemitic. 

A 2008 survey of American Christians by the Pew Forum on Religion and Public Life found that over 60% of most denominations believe that Jews will receive eternal life after death alongside Christians.

Christian liturgy

In Catholic liturgy, a prayer for the conversion of the Jews is found in the Good Friday prayer for the Jews. The wording of the prayer has undergone numerous changes in wording, and although the specific hope of a mass conversion is not envisaged in the prayer, the 2008 version of the prayer makes reference to Romans 11:26 ("all Israel be saved"). The 2008 version of the prayer reads:

A 2011 retranslation now reads:

The Directory of Public Worship approved by the Westminster Assembly states that a prayer is to be made for the conversion of the Jews. The service of Vespers on Great Friday in the Eastern Orthodox Church and Byzantine Catholic churches uses the expression "impious and transgressing people", but the strongest expressions are in the Orthros of Great Friday, which includes the same phrase, but also speaks of "the murderers of God, the lawless nation of the Jews" and referring to "the assembly of the Jews", prays: "But give them, O Lord, their reward, for they devised vain things against Thee."  As of 2015, the Ukrainian Orthodox Church was still using the term "lawless synagogue" in their Great Friday Vespers.

Cultural references
The conversion of the Jews is occasionally used in literature as a symbol of the far distant future. In Andrew Marvell's poem To His Coy Mistress, it says, "And you should, if you please, refuse / Till the conversion of the Jews."

"The Conversion of the Jews" is the title of a 1958 short story by Philip Roth about a Jewish youth who threatens to commit suicide unless his co-religionists accept Jesus.

See also
 Christian Restorationism
 Christian Zionism
 Jewish Christian
 Supersessionism

References

External links
Confessional Lutheran perspective
 WELS Topical Q&A: Jews as the "chosen people", archived by Internet Archive
 WELS Topical Q&A: "All Israel will be saved" archived by Internet Archive
Jewish perspective on 2015 Vatican declaration concerning proselytization of Jews
 What the Vatican Didn’t Say—And What It Did by Yoram Hazony

Conversion of Jews to Christianity
Christian eschatology
Christianity and antisemitism